Shahrak-e Tareh Tajemi Sahlabad (also Romanized as Shahraḵ-e Tareḥ Tajemīʿ Sahlābād) is a village in Shusef Rural District, Shusef District, Nehbandan County, South Khorasan Province, Iran. At the 2006 census, its population was 83, in 24 families.

References 

Populated places in Nehbandan County